Let There Be Light is a 2019 Slovak-language drama film directed by Marko Škop. The film is produced by Jan Melis, Petr Oukropec, Marko Skop, and Pavel Strnad. The film stars Frantisek Beles, Milan Ondrík, Dieter Fischer, and Ingrid Timková. It was selected as the Slovak entry for the Best International Feature Film at the 92nd Academy Awards, but it was not nominated.

Plot 
A Slovakian man who works in Germany, soon learns that his son joined a paramilitary youth group, which was involved in the death of a classmate.

Cast 
 Frantisek Beles as Adam
 Milan Ondrík as Milan
 Dieter Fischer as Roman
 Ingrid Timková as Maid

Reception

Critical response 
Richard Mowe of Eye For Film wrote, "Škop had made a series of award-winning documentaries before his feature début on Eva Nová, and now Let There Be Light confirms his talents as an assured director of actors and a director-writer of great economy and rigour.".The Prague Reporter wrote, "Holding together Let There Be Light is an especially empathetic lead performance from Ondrík: his Milan, at first presented as an irrepressibly cheerful character who just wants to do the right thing slowly has the positive outlook drained right out of him during the course of the movie.". Alissa Simon of Variety wrote, "The multilayered “Let There Be Light” is an earnest, relatable state-of-the-nation drama from helmer-writer Marko Škop that highlights xenophobia, religious hypocrisy and the rise of the extreme right in a small Slovak village.".

Accolades

See also
 List of submissions to the 92nd Academy Awards for Best International Feature Film
 List of Slovak submissions for the Academy Award for Best International Feature Film

References

External links 
 

2019 films
2019 drama films
Slovak drama films
Czech drama films